Tilagupha is an urban municipality located in Kalikot District of Karnali Province of Nepal.

The municipality is divided into total 11 wards.

The municipality was established on 10 March 2017, when Government of Nepal restricted all old administrative structure and announced 744 local level units as per the new constitution of Nepal 2015.

Phoi Mahadev, Ranchuli, Jubika, Chhapre and part of Chilkhaya Village development committees were incorporated to form this new municipality. The headquarters of the municipality is situated at Jubika.

References

External links
 http://www.tilagufamun.gov.np/
 https://www.citypopulation.de/php/nepal-mun-admin.php?adm2id=6409

Populated places in Kalikot District
Municipalities in Karnali Province
Nepal municipalities established in 2017